Chushka is a rural locality (a settlement) in Zaporozhskoye Rural Settlement of Temryuksky District, in Krasnodar Krai, Russia. Population:

References 

Rural localities in Krasnodar Krai
Temryuksky District